Sonuchi (also Romanized as Sonūchī; also known as Sownochī, Sūnīchī, Sūnochī, and Sūnūchī) is a village in Emamzadeh Abdol Aziz Rural District, Jolgeh District, Isfahan County, Isfahan Province, Iran. At the 2006 census, its population was 149, in 42 families.

References 

Populated places in Isfahan County